Tyeler Davison (born September 23, 1992) is an American football nose tackle for the Los Angeles Chargers of the National Football League (NFL). He played college football at Fresno State. He was drafted by the New Orleans Saints in the fifth round of the 2015 NFL Draft.

High school
Davison attended Washington High School his freshman year where he played freshman football as well as games on the varsity football team. He was also on the Rams wrestling team. After his freshman year he moved to Scottsdale where he attended Desert Mountain High School. He lettered in wrestling and football his sophomore, junior and senior year.

He was considered a two-star recruit by Rivals.com.

Professional career

New Orleans Saints 
Davison was selected by the New Orleans Saints in the fifth round, 154th overall in the 2015 NFL Draft. The pick used to select him was acquired from the Kansas City Chiefs in a trade that sent Ben Grubbs to Kansas City. Davison finished his rookie season with 18 tackles and 1.5 sacks.

Atlanta Falcons 
On April 13, 2019, Davison signed a one-year contract with the Atlanta Falcons. He played in all 16 games with 12 starts, recording a career-high 55 tackles and one sack.

On March 17, 2020, Davison signed a three-year, $12 million contract extension with the Falcons. He was placed on the reserve/COVID-19 list by the team on July 31, 2020, and was activated five days later. He was released on March 15, 2022.

Cleveland Browns
On October 11, 2022, Davison was signed to the Cleveland Browns practice squad.

Los Angeles Chargers
On November 16, 2022, Davison was signed by the Los Angeles Chargers off the Browns practice squad.

References

External links
 Fresno State Bulldogs bio

1992 births
Living people
Players of American football from Scottsdale, Arizona
American football defensive ends
American football defensive tackles
Fresno State Bulldogs football players
New Orleans Saints players
Atlanta Falcons players
Cleveland Browns players
Los Angeles Chargers players